The Dayton Regional STEM School, often abbreviated DRSS, is located in Kettering, Ohio, United States. Its first class graduated in 2013 after starting in ninth grade.

History
The Dayton Regional STEM School opened for the 2009–2010 school year, admitting only ninth grade students. The School originally used a facility provided by Wright State University, before moving to its own facility in 2011. Over time the school has expanded, and now provides schooling for grades six through twelve.

References

External links
School website

Public high schools in Ohio
High schools in Montgomery County, Ohio
Kettering, Ohio
Educational institutions established in 2009
2009 establishments in Ohio